The BRM P57 (originally referred in 1961 as the BRM P48/57 and in 1962 as the BRM P578) was a Formula One racing car built to race in Formula One from 1962 to 1965.

Development

1961
Like the other British teams, BRM was caught off-guard by new regulations for the 1961 Formula 1 season that limited engines to 1.5 litres. They had a new 1.5 liter V8 engine on the drawing board, but it was not likely to be ready until late in the season. (In the event, it did not race until the next year). The Coventry Climax 4-cylinder unit used by Cooper and Team Lotus was chosen as a stopgap solution. It was installed in the first BRM spaceframe chassis, based on the 1960 BRM P48 Mark II designed by Tony Rudd. The P48 Mark II had abandoned the single rear disc brake introduced by the P25 in favor of a more conventional 2 disc layout at the rear.

At 450 kg, the new BRM P57 was heavier than its British rivals, and the Climax engine was no match for the V6 in the Ferrari 156. The later V8-powered version of the P57 was originally designated the P578, but both types have since been commonly referred to as the P57.

1962
The P578's design can be traced back to the Climax-powered P57 (also called P48/P57) that was raced in 1961. The car's tubular spaceframe and suspension remained unchanged. The underpowered Coventry Climax engine was replaced with BRM's own V8, producing 190 horsepower. Also new for BRM was a Lucas fuel injection system. Although it produced about the same power as the Climax, BRM's unit could run up to 11,000 rpm, some 3,500 rpm faster. Mounted to the back of the engine was Colotti's new 6 speed gearbox. However, reliability problems forced BRM to revert to their own, older specification, 5 speed unit. The original eight exhausts were mounted vertically, but they were prone to working loose and were replaced by a more conventional horizontal layout.

1963 
A new model was not prepared in time for the 1963 season. To keep the P57 competitive, a 6 speed gearbox was mounted to the engine, which also featured a new injection system.

Racing history 
With Joakim Bonnier and Dan Gurney leaving to drive for the new Porsche team, BRM ran only two cars, for Graham Hill and Tony Brooks. The cars proved able to last for the Grand Prix distance, but they were not competitive. Points were not gained until the fourth race of the season, the French Grand Prix at Reims. Brooks scored a remarkable third and Hill a fifth in the final round, the United States Grand Prix at Watkins Glen, but this result was helped by Ferrari's withdrawal after the death of Wolfgang von Trips. BRM finished with only 7 points, good for fifth and last of the regular runners in the constructor's championship.

Graham Hill was retained for the following seasons, but Tony Brooks, although only 29 (three years younger than Hill) retired from Formula One, disillusioned with the 1.5 litre cars and with a new motor dealership to run. His replacement was Richie Ginther, a 30 year old American coming off a promising year with Ferrari. The season began with Hill taking a well-deserved first victory at the 1962 Dutch Grand Prix. The championship proved to be a season-long battle between Hill and Jim Clark, driving the revolutionary monocoque Lotus 25. Clark's Lotus was the faster, but Hill's BRM was the more reliable. Clark took 6 poles and 3 victories, but only finished in the points 4 times. Hill's BRM remarkably finished every race and won 3 of the last 4 races of the season in Germany, Italy, and South Africa on the way to his first championship. Ginther's year proved disappointing, taking just two podiums and retiring 4 times. Despite Ginther's underwhelming season, BRM outscored Lotus to take their only constructor's title. 

The first race of 1963, the Monaco Grand Prix, looked to be a repeat of the previous year. Clark led from pole before the fragile Lotus broke, handing Hill the first of his five Monaco Grand Prix victories. However, problems with the new gearbox forced Hill to retire from the next two Grands Prix while Clark achieved 4 consecutive wins. Clark won 3 of the last 5 races and stormed to the championship. Hill took another victory in the United States, but it was little consolation. In Germany and Italy, Hill drove BRM's new monocoque P61, but its problems forced BRM to revert to the P57. Hill and Ginther scored a combined 10 podiums, and were 2nd and 3rd in the driver's championship. BRM's 29 points placed them behind only Lotus.

The P261 succeeded the P57 in 1964, but privateers such as Scuderia Centro Sud ran P57s until the end of 1965.

Complete Formula One World Championship results

 This total includes points scored by the BRM P61   This total includes points scored by the BRM P261

References

BRM Formula One cars
Formula One championship-winning cars